Douglas, Illinois may refer to:
Douglas, Knox County, Illinois, an unincorporated community in Knox County
Douglas, St. Clair County, Illinois, an unincorporated community in St. Clair County
 Douglas, Chicago, a neighborhood of Chicago